Okanagana rimosa, or Say's cicada, is a species of cicada in the family Cicadidae. It is found in North America. the larvae live for strictly four years.

Subspecies
These two subspecies belong to the species Okanagana rimosa:
 Okanagana rimosa ohioensis Davis, 1942
 Okanagana rimosa rimosa (Say, 1830)

References

Further reading

 

Articles created by Qbugbot
Insects described in 1830
Okanagana